Simone Louise Buchanan is an Australian film and television actress, and television director. She is best known for her television roles as Debbie Kelly in the situation comedy Hey Dad..! and Samantha Fitzgerald in the soap opera Neighbours.

Early life	
Buchanan's siblings Miles Buchanan and Beth Buchanan are also actors. All three appeared in the children's television show Secret Valley.

Career
Buchanan has appeared in several films, including playing a rape victim in Shame, and as Laura Harris – and eventually Anna Dodwell – in the Australian drama series Pacific Drive.

In 2008, Buchanan played Samantha Fitzgerald, the bipolar-suffering estranged wife of Dan Fitzgerald (Brett Tucker), in the long-running soap opera Neighbours. Originally appearing for three months, from March to June, the character's introduction was considered a success, leading to her return for a second three-month stint from November to February 2009. The character appeared for a four-week guest role in late 2010, to coincide with the 6,000th episode celebrations.

Buchanan returned to the Neighbours set in 2018 as a director, after the series producer Jason Herbison asked her to do her director's attachment with the show. Buchanan also appears in the 2018 horror film Boar, alongside John Jarratt, Ernie Dingo, Steve Bisley and Roger Ward.

Personal life
Buchanan has been married to Brett Smith since 2008. She has a son, Tane (born 1998), from a previous relationship. In August 2009, it was announced that Buchanan was expecting her second child, due in early 2010. The pregnancy was achieved with IVF treatment. Buchanan gave birth to a son, Rémy, via caesarean section.

In March 2010, Buchanan supported Sarah Monahan, a co-star on the Hey Dad..! television show, over allegations that fellow star Robert Hughes had engaged in inappropriate sexual behaviour on the set of the show. Buchanan claimed she had approached the show's producer about the alleged assaults but that he instructed her to keep quiet. She testified at Hughes' 2014 trial that she only heard allegations about his inappropriate behaviour and never saw it for herself.

Filmography

FILM

TELEVISION

|-
| 1978 || A Good Thing Going || Cathy Harris ||
|-
| 1979 || My Brilliant Career || Mary Anne ||
|-
| 1980 || Secret Valley || Simone ||
|-
| rowspan="2" | 1981 || Run Rebecca, Run || Rebecca ||
|-
| Doctors & Nurses || Jane Gilmour ||
|-
| rowspan="2" | 1982 || Runaway Island || Jemma McLeod ||
|-
| The Mystery at Castle House || Kate || 
|-
| rowspan="3" | 1984 || A Country Practice || Sharon Barnes || (Series 4 Episode 69), (Series 4 Episode 70)
|- 
| The Man from the High Country || Debbie Lomax ||
|-
| Run Chrissie Run! || Cathy ||
|-
| rowspan="2" | 1985 || Sons and Daughters || Donna Jackson || Unknown Episodes
|-
| The Flying Doctors || Lucy Daniels || Original mini-series pilot
|-
| 1986 || Platypus Cove || Jenny Nelson ||
|-
| 1987 || Hey Dad! || Debbie Kelly || All Episodes (1987–1990)
|-
| 1988 || Shame || Lizzie Curtis || 
|-
| 1991 || A Country Practice || Sara Kennedy ||
|-
| 1991 || Push || Sara Kennedy || (Series 11 Episode 61), (Series 11 Episode 62)
|-
| 1993 ||G.P.  || Mickey Davis || (Series 5 Episode 28)
|-
| 1995 || Pacific Drive || Laura Harris ||
|-
| 1998 || All Saints || Mitchie Bell || (Series 1 Episode 22)
|-
| 1999 || Water Rats || Jenny Spiro || (Series 4 Episode 6)
|-
| 2000, 2003 || Blue Heelers || Nurse Angie Cohen || (Series 7 Episode 35), (Series 10 Episode 8)
|-
| 2005 || Forced Entry || Julie ||
|-
| 2006 || McLeod's Daughters || Amy Tanaka || (Series 6 Episode 13)
|-
| 2008–2010, 2020 || Neighbours || Samantha Fitzgerald || Recurring guest
|-
| 2017 || Boar || Debbie Malone
|}

References

External links

Living people
Australian television actresses
Actresses from Sydney
Australian film actresses
Year of birth missing (living people)